Dakota Louis Meyer (born June 26, 1988) is a former United States Marine. A veteran of the War in Afghanistan, he was awarded the Medal of Honor for his actions during the Battle of Ganjgal on September 8, 2009, in Kunar Province, Afghanistan. Meyer is the second-youngest living Medal of Honor recipient, the third living recipient for either the Iraq War or the War in Afghanistan, and the first living United States Marine in 38 years to be so honored.

Early life and education
Meyer was born and raised in Columbia, Kentucky, the son of Felicia Carole Ferree "Killy" Gilliam and Michael Allen Meyer. In 2006, after graduation from Green County High School, he enlisted in the United States Marine Corps at a recruiting station in Louisville, Kentucky and completed boot camp at Marine Corps Recruit Depot Parris Island.

Military service

Meyer deployed to Fallujah, Iraq in 2007 as a scout sniper with 3rd Battalion, 3rd Marines. He gained national attention for his actions in Afghanistan during his second deployment in Kunar Province with Embedded Training Team 2–8. 

On September 8, 2009, near the village of Ganjgal, Meyer learned that three Marines and a Navy Corpsman, who were members of Meyer's squad and his friends, were missing after being ambushed by a group of insurgents. Under enemy fire, Meyer entered an area known to be inhabited by insurgents and eventually found the four missing servicemen dead and stripped of their weapons, body armor and radios. There he saw a Taliban fighter trying to take the bodies. The fighter tackled Meyer, and after a brief scuffle, Meyer grabbed a baseball-sized rock and beat the fighter to death. With the help of Afghan soldiers, he moved the bodies to a safer area where they could be extracted. During his search, Meyer "personally evacuated 12 friendly wounded and provided cover for another 24 Marines and soldiers to escape likely death at the hands of a numerically superior and determined foe."

Four U.S. servicemen died in the ambush: 
1st Lt. Michael Johnson, 25, of Virginia Beach, Virginia
Gunnery Sgt. Aaron Kenefick, 30, of Roswell, Georgia
Gunnery Sgt. Edwin Wayne Johnson Jr., 31, of Columbus, Georgia
Hospital Corpsman Third Class James R. Layton, 22, of Riverbank, California.

A fifth man, Army SFC Kenneth W. Westbrook, 41, of Shiprock, New Mexico, later died from his wounds.

On November 6, 2010, the Commandant of the Marine Corps, General James F. Amos, told reporters during a visit to Camp Pendleton, California that a living United States Marine had been nominated for the Medal of Honor. Two days later, Marine Corps Times, an independent newspaper covering Marine Corps operations, reported that the unnamed person was Meyer, citing anonymous sources. CNN confirmed the story independently two days later.

On June 9, 2011, the Marine Corps announced that two other Marines on Meyer's team in Ganjgal would receive the Navy Cross, the second-highest award for valor a Marine can receive. Capt. Ademola D. Fabayo and Staff Sgt. Juan J. Rodriguez-Chavez were recognized for their roles in retrieving the bodies of the fallen Marines and Corpsman. Before Meyer began searching for the missing servicemen on foot, Rodriguez-Chavez drove a gun truck into the kill zone with Fabayo manning the truck's machine gun.

When President Barack Obama's staff called Meyer to set up a time for the president to inform him that his case for the Medal of Honor had been approved, they were told Meyer was working at his construction job and were asked to call again during his lunch break.

Meyer was awarded the Medal of Honor in a ceremony on September 15, 2011. When a White House staffer contacted Meyer to arrange the ceremony, Meyer asked if he could have a beer with the president, and President Obama agreed to the request. He received an invitation to the White House for the afternoon before the ceremony. Meyer also requested that when he was honored, simultaneous commemorative services should be held at other associated locations to honor the memory of his colleagues who died or were mortally wounded during the ambush and his rescue attempts.

Civilian
A year after the Battle of Ganjgal, after drinking at a friend's house, Meyer attempted to commit suicide using a Glock pistol kept in his truck's glove compartment. The gun was not loaded. Meyer later sought help for post-traumatic stress disorder.

In September 2011, Kentucky Governor Steve Beshear bestowed upon Meyer the honorary title of Kentucky Colonel during an event in his hometown of Greensburg in which Meyer served as grand marshal.

Meyer filed a lawsuit against his former employer, defense contractor BAE Systems, alleging the company and his supervisor punished him for his opposition to a weapons sale to Pakistan. The lawsuit claimed that BAE Systems ridiculed Meyer's Medal of Honor, called him mentally unstable and suggested he had a drinking problem, thereby costing him a job. On December 15, 2011, BAE announced that the parties resolved their dispute out of court.

On December 14, 2011, McClatchy news outlets published an article which questioned the actual number of lives Meyer saved. The article explained that accounts leading to Medal of Honor awards are frequently inaccurate, and that in Meyer's case "crucial parts that the Marine Corps publicized were untrue, unsubstantiated or exaggerated". At the same time, the article emphasized that Meyer "by all accounts deserved his nomination."

Meyer and Bing West wrote the book Into the Fire: A Firsthand Account of the Most Extraordinary Battle in the Afghan War, about the Battle of Ganjgal. It was published on September 25, 2012. In the book, Meyer makes a case for Army Captain William D. Swenson to be awarded the Medal of Honor; Swenson had criticized Army officers at the nearby Forward Operating Base Joyce for not providing fire support, leading to accusations that the paperwork for his Medal of Honor recommendation had been "lost" as punishment. Those same officers were later cited following a military investigation for "negligent" leadership leading "directly to the loss of life" on the battlefield. Swenson was awarded the Medal of Honor on October 15, 2013, over four years after first being recommended for the award.

In 2013, Meyer participated in the fourth season of Maximum Warrior, a TV competition among U.S.-military operators, featuring ten military-inspired challenges. Meyer, eliminated on the eighth episode, "Night Hostage Rescue", airing November 26, 2013, finished in fourth place.
As of 2015, Meyer sits on the advisory board for VETPAW, an organization of U.S. military veterans dedicated to protecting African wildlife.

Meyer is a proponent of legalizing the medical use of cannabis, which he says can help veterans suffering from PTSD while also reducing usage of opioid drugs.  In March 2018, Meyer co-authored an op-ed calling for medical cannabis to be legalized in Kentucky.

Personal life
Meyer married Cassandra Marie Wain on May 17, 2008, in Campbellsville, Kentucky. They were divorced in 2010. 

On March 13, 2015, Meyer became engaged to Bristol Palin, daughter of former Alaska Governor Sarah Palin. On May 18, the Palin family announced that the May 23 wedding had been called off. On June 25, Palin announced that she was pregnant for a second time. She gave birth to a daughter on December 23. 

On January 6, 2016, People reported that Meyer was the biological father of the child, and that Meyer had filed legal documents asking for joint legal and physical custody of the newborn and child support from Palin. That March, Palin and Meyer reached an interim joint legal and physical custody agreement. On May 23, exactly one year after they were originally to have wed, Palin and Meyer married. In December, Palin announced that she was expecting her third child, her second with Meyer. 

On May 8, 2017, she gave birth to a daughter. 

On January 29, 2018, Meyer filed for divorce, citing a "conflict of personalities". On August 1, Palin confirmed that her divorce from Meyer was finalized.

Books
Into the Fire: A Firsthand Account of the Most Extraordinary Battle in the Afghan War
The Way Forward: Master Life's Toughest Battles and Create Your Lasting Legacy

Honors and awards

Military awards

Medal of Honor

Medal of Honor citation

"The President of the United States in the name of The Congress takes pleasure in presenting the MEDAL OF HONOR to 

For service as set forth in the following:

See also

 List of post-Vietnam War Medal of Honor recipients

References

External links

 
 
 Marine Cpl. Dakota Meyer Confirmed for Medal of Honor
 Sergeant Dakota Meyer Shadow Box from togetherweserved.com
 Interview with Dakota Meyer by Bing West on Into the Fire at the Pritzker Military Museum & Library on October 3, 2012
 Dakota Meyer citation from Congressional Model of Honor Foundation 

1988 births
United States Marine Corps personnel of the Iraq War
United States Marine Corps personnel of the War in Afghanistan (2001–2021)
Living people
People from Columbia, Kentucky
United States Marine Corps Medal of Honor recipients
United States Marines
War in Afghanistan (2001–2021) recipients of the Medal of Honor
Palin family
American cannabis activists
American media personalities